Douglas da Costa Souza (born January 31, 1979 in Fortaleza), or simply Bilica, is a Brazilian footballer who plays as a defensive midfielder.

Honours
Sport Club do Recife
Santa Catarina State League: 2007

Contract
26 June 2007 to 31 December 2007

External links

meusport

1979 births
Living people
Sportspeople from Fortaleza
Brazilian footballers
Associação Chapecoense de Futebol players
Maranhão Atlético Clube players
Moto Club de São Luís players
Sampaio Corrêa Futebol Clube players
Sport Club do Recife players
Vila Nova Futebol Clube players
Clube de Regatas Brasil players
Association football midfielders